After You is a romance novel written by Jojo Moyes. It is a sequel to Me Before You. The book was first published on 29 September 2015 in the United Kingdom. A third novel in the series, Still Me, was published in January 2018.

Plot
After You is a continuation of Louisa Clark's life after Will's death. It follows her journey of recovery after losing her beloved. Encouraged by Will to make her life more meaningful, she moves to London and gets a job at an airport bar. One night, she goes up to the roof of her residence to sit alone, when someone begins to talk to her. Panicking, Louisa falls off the roof and severely injures herself. After her recovery, she enrolls in a support group in a church. Will's daughter Lily contacts Louisa, seeking information about her deceased father, whom she didn't know existed until after he had died. Lily wants to get to know her grandparents as well, so she moves in with Louisa. However, she hates living with her mother, stepfather, and her half-brothers. 

Meanwhile, Louisa gets to know Sam, the uncle of one of the boys in her support group. Sam is one of the paramedics who helped save her life after her accident. They become romantically involved. Louisa's friend Nathan gets in contact with her and offers her a job in the USA. She attends the interview for this job and gets accepted, even though it was a hard decision for Louisa, as she had just started to fall for Sam.

References

External links

2015 British novels
British romance novels
Contemporary romance novels
Michael Joseph books
Pamela Dorman Books books